Amalfi's Italian Restaurant, also known as Amalfi's Restaurant and Mercato, is an Italian restaurant in Portland, Oregon.

Description 
Amalfi's is a Black-owned restaurant serving Italian cuisine on Fremont Street in northeast Portland's Cully neighborhood. The menu includes pizza and lasagna. The restaurant hosts live music regularly. PDX Rosie, a mural depicting a Black woman posing like Rosie the Riveter, is painted on the restaurant's exterior.

History 
Amalfi's was established in 1959. Kiauna Floyd has owned the restaurant since 2006. She commissioned PDX Rosie in 2020. The business used a large tent in the parking lot for outdoor seating during the COVID-19 pandemic (2020–2021).

Reception 
In Thrillist's 2018 overview of "How to Find the Weird Old Portland Behind the New Hipster Portlandia", Kashann Kilson said Amalfi's "has been Portland's best Italian restaurant for more than half a century".

See also

 List of Black-owned restaurants
 List of Italian restaurants

References

External links

 

1959 establishments in Oregon
Black-owned restaurants in the United States
Cully, Portland, Oregon
Italian restaurants in Portland, Oregon
Restaurants established in 1959